Świebodów is a village in the administrative district of Gmina Krośnice, within Milicz County, Lower Silesian Voivodeship, in south-western Poland. Prior to 1945 it was in Germany.

It is the birthplace of Polish road bicycle racer and Olympic medallist Ryszard Szurkowski.

References

Villages in Milicz County